Jiří Kynos (born 24 March 1943 in Třebechovice pod Orebem) is a Czech former track and field sprinter who competed in the 1972 Summer Olympics. He competed in the 200 metres and 4x100 metres relay races, winning 4th in the 4x100 in the Olympics. In the 1971 European championships, he helped Czechoslovakia win 1st in the 4x100 metres relay.

References

1943 births
Living people
Czech male sprinters
Olympic athletes of Czechoslovakia
Athletes (track and field) at the 1972 Summer Olympics
European Athletics Championships medalists
People from Třebechovice pod Orebem
Sportspeople from the Hradec Králové Region